Trimethylsilane is the organosilicon compound with the formula (CH3)3SiH. It is a trialkylsilane. The Si-H bond is  reactive. It is less commonly used as a reagent than the related triethylsilane, which is a liquid at room temperature.

Trimethylsilane is used in the semiconductor industry as precursor to deposit dielectrics and barrier layers via plasma-enhanced chemical vapor deposition (PE-CVD). It is also used a source gas to deposit TiSiCN hard coatings via plasma-enhanced magnetron sputtering (PEMS). It has also been used to deposit silicon carbide hard coatings via low-pressure chemical vapor deposition (LP-CVD) at relatively low temperatures  under 1000 °C. It is an expensive gas but safer to use than silane (SiH4); and produces properties in the coatings that cannot be undertaken by multiple source gases containing silicon and carbon.

See also
 Dimethylsilane
 Trimethylsilyl functional group

References

Carbosilanes
Trimethylsilyl compounds